Örüg Temür Khan, possibly Gulichi (Mongolian:  γuyilinči, Gulichi only called by the Ming Dynasty in this period), (?–1408) was a khagan of the Northern Yuan dynasty, reigning from 1402 to 1408. Örüg Temür in historical materials compiled by the Timurid dynasty have been a descendant of Ögedei. Örüg Temür might also have been descended from either Ariq Böke or Genghis Khan's younger brothers, either Hasar or Temüge.

Elbeg Khan appointed Bahamu (Batula, Mahamu, Muhamud) ruler of the Four Oirats after he had mistakenly executed his father Khuuhai. The Khagan's decision disappointed the Oirat Torguud clan leader Ugetchi Khashikha ("Khashikha" means prince or duke in the Tungusic languages). Ugetchi Khashikha and Bahamu organized the plot to kill Elbeg and succeeded; the former seized the family and property of the late Khagan. There's a dispute over whether Örüg Temür was the same person as Ugechi Khashikha himself, because the Ming Dynasty recorded fierce battles between Gulichi of Eastern Mongols and Oirat's leaders. Thus, it is still unclear whether he was an Oirat or a Genghisid. The History of Ming recorded that Gulichi became the new khagan in 1402 and abolished the dynastic title of "Great Yuan" (大元) promulgated in 1271 by Kublai; however, the Han-style title had already been abolished in 1388.

Reign 
Gulichi appointed Arughtai of the Asud chingsang of the Eastern Mongols. According to Ming annals, he might have nominated a “Tatar” (East Mongols)  khan. The Yongle Emperor made overtures to Gulichi and his principal retainer Arughtai to establish a relationship within Ming China's tributary system, but Gulichi and Arughtai rejected it. They also poisoned Engke Temur, Prince of Hami, who had allied with the Ming. However, Gulichi was defeated by Öljei Temür Khan, the Kublaid descent Borjigin monarch, in 1403. In 1408, his former chingsang and noyan Arughtai killed him after a conflict erupted between them.

See also
 List of khans of the Northern Yuan dynasty

References

René Grousset - Empire of Steppes
Ж.Бор - Монгол хийгээд Евразийн дипломат шаштир БОТЬ 3

1408 deaths
Northern Yuan rulers
15th-century Mongol rulers
15th-century Chinese monarchs
Year of birth unknown